The 145th Air Refueling Squadron (145 ARS) is an inactive unit of the Ohio Air National Guard 121st Air Refueling Wing located at Rickenbacker Air National Guard Base, Columbus, Ohio. The 145th was equipped with the KC-135R Stratotanker. The squadron was inactivated during 2014.

History
The 145th Air Transport Squadron was allotted to the Ohio Air National Guard in early 1956 by the National Guard Bureau to replace the 112th Fighter-Bomber Squadron at Akron-Canton Airport.  The 112th was forced to move from Akron to Toledo Municipal Airport, on 1 April 1956 when the F-84E Thunderjet aircraft it was programmed to receive were unable to use the short runways at Akron.

The 145th ATS was a new Air National Guard organization, not having any prior USAF history or lineage. The 145th ATS, gained by the Military Air Transport Service (MATS), was assigned to the 121st Tactical Fighter Wing at Columbus for administrative and logistical support.  The 145th received federal recognition on 17 March 1956.

Initially assigned C-46D Commando twin-engine propeller transports, the squadron was upgraded in 1958 to C-119J Flying Boxcar transports, fitted for aeromedical transport of personnel to medical facilities.

Tactical Air Command
The mission of the squadron was realigned to air refueling of Tactical Air Command aircraft in July 1961 with the expansion of the unit to group level, and the authorization by the National Guard Bureau of the 160th Air Refueling Group.   Again, the short runways at Akron led to the movement of the squadron to Clinton County Air Force Base when it received large, four-engined KC-97 Stratofreighters. In 1964, it participated in Operation "Ready Go", the first all United States Air National Guard (ANG) non-stop deployment of fighter aircraft to Europe.

In 1965, the KC-97Gs were upgraded to KC-97Ls with addition of jet engine pods mounted to the outboard wings.  1967 saw the beginning of Operation Creek Party, a continuous rotational mission flying from Rhein Main Air Base, West Germany, providing air refueling to United States Air Forces in Europe (USAFE) tactical aircraft.  The success of this operation, which would continue until 1975, demonstrated the ability of the Air National Guard to perform significant day-to-day missions without being mobilized.  The 160th was one of the mission's "Charter" units and when its Creek Party participation ended it had safely flown 426 transatlantic crossings.  The unit received the Air Force Outstanding Unit Award for the period of 5 June 1967 to 10 May 1968.

The Group Commander at the time, Colonel Frank Cattran, considered aircraft tail number 52-2630 to be "his" bird and often flew it in preference to any of the others.  This aircraft became involved in a "Sister City" ceremony with Zeppelinheim, Germany - a small town near Rhein-Main AB - near the end of the Creek Party operation.  Upon the Unit's conversion from KC-97s to KC-13's this aircraft was transferred to the USAF Museum at Wright-Patterson Air Force Base, in Dayton, Ohio, where it can be seen today with its Ohio Air National Guard and Zeppelinheim markings.

In 1971, Clinton County Air Force Base was closed as a result of the Nixon Administration looking to save money because of the Vietnam War.   As part of the moving out of units from Clinton County AFB, the 160th ARG was moved to Lockbourne Air Force Base near Columbus, Ohio.

A second Air Force Outstanding Unit Award was received for the period of 11 May 1968 to 30 June 1975.

Strategic Air Command
In December 1974 Tactical Air Command transferred its Air Refueling units to Strategic Air Command.  Later in 1975, the 160th ARG became the first Air National Guard unit to convert to the Boeing KC-135 Stratotanker all jet tanker aircraft as part of SAC's Eighth Air Force.  The group was the first ANG unit to perform the SAC 24-hour Alert mission and pass a SAC Operational Readiness Inspection in July 1976.

The 160th also participated in SAC overseas Tanker Task Forces and other priority missions worldwide. In 1984, the KC-135As were re-engined and redesignated as KC-135Es.  The upgrade to turbofan engines provided a significant increase in performance, safety and reliability.

In August 1990, the 160th was one of the first Air Guard units to deploy aircraft to the Middle East after Iraq's invasion of Kuwait.   Aircraft, aircrews and support personnel began volunteer rotational Desert Shield deployments to a provisional Tanker Task Force at King Abdul Aziz Air Base, Jeddah, Saudi Arabia (1709th ARS (P)).  The 160th was called to active duty on 20 December 1990.  Deployment began on 28 December and the 160th became part of three Provisional Air Refueling Wings at Al Banteen Air Base, Abu Dhabi (1712th ARS (P)), Al Dhafra Air Base, Dubai (1705th ARS (P)), and Jeddah.  Additional personnel augmented a regional support base at Moron AB, Spain while others deployed to various bases to "backfill" for deployed active duty personnel.   Aircraft and volunteer aircrews were heavily involved in "Air Bridge" refueling missions supporting deployment of combat forces to Southwest Asia.

Combat flying missions for Operation Desert Storm commenced on 17 January 1991.  The 160th compiled a remarkable record of mission accomplishment during combat operations.  When hostilities ended, the 160th returned home in March 1991 to a tremendous welcome by families and friends.

September 1991 brought the stand down of the SAC Alert mission which the 160th ARG had maintained continuously for more than 15 years.  The 145th ARS began the conversion to KC-135R aircraft in October 1991, and in June 1992, the Strategic Air Command was inactivated with 160th ARG becoming part of the new Air Mobility Command.

Air Mobility Command
In September 1993, the 145th Air Refueling Squadron's parent 160th ARG was inactivated when budget reductions forced a reorganization of the Ohio Air National Guard units at Rickenbacker AGB.  The 145th ARS was reassigned to the new 121st Operations Group under the re-organized 121st Air Refueling Wing, joining with the 166th Air Refueling Squadron, which had become a KC-135R squadron in 1992 when it retired its A-7D Corsair II ground support aircraft.  With the addition of the 145th ARS, the 121st ARW became one of only a few "Super Wings" in the ANG, with twice as many aircraft assigned as other units.

Under the 120th ARW, the squadron began flying from bases in southern France to support strike aircraft during Operation Deny Flight missions over the Balkans. The unit was a fixture at Incirlik Air Base, Turkey, as well as Prince Sultan Air Base, Saudi Arabia, supporting Operations Northern Watch and Operation Southern Watch, respectively, over Iraq.

After the terrorist attacks on 11 September 2001, the 121st Air Refueling Wing launched into immediate action supporting armed aircraft over the United States during Operation Noble Eagle. The 121st ARW had the distinction of flying more missions than any other unit during this time. The 121st ARW has also deployed and participated in War in Afghanistan (2001–2021), as well as in the Iraq War after 2003.

In addition to the combat deployments, the unit has also been very heavily tasked with airlift missions during national emergencies. Immediately following Hurricane Katrina in August 2005, the 121ARW was one of the first units to send aircraft into Louisiana filled with supplies and troops. Similar missions were flown in September 2005, after Hurricane Rita.

The squadron conducted its final KC-135R flight on 24 September 2013. The 145th stood down during 2014.

Lineage
 Designated: 145th Air Transport Squadron, and allotted to Ohio ANG, in 1956
 Extended federal recognition on 17 March 1956
 Re-designated: 145th Aeromedical Transport Squadron, 1 July 1958
 Re-designated: 145th Air Refueling Squadron, 8 July 1961
 Federalized and ordered to active service on: 20 December 1990
 Released from active duty and returned to Ohio state control, 15 March 1991
 Components designated as: 145th Expeditionary Air Refueling Squadron when deployed as part of an Air and Space Expeditionary unit after June 1996.

Assignments
 121st Fighter-Interceptor Wing, 17 March 1956
 121st Fighter-Bomber Wing, 1 November 1957
 160th Air Refueling Group, 8 July 1961
 Elements detached to: 1709th Air Refueling Wing (Provisional), 20 December 1990 – 15 March 1991
 121st Operations Group, 1 October 1993 – Present

Stations
 Akron-Canton Airport, Ohio, 17 March 1956
 Clinton County Air Force Base, Ohio, 1 July 1961
 Lockbourne Air Force Base, Ohio, 1 October 1971
 Re-designated: Rickenbacker Air Force Base, 18 May 1974
 Re-designated: Rickenbacker Air National Guard Base, 1 April 1980-Present

Aircraft

 C-46D Commando, 1956-1958
 C-119J Flying Boxcar, 1958-1961
 KC-97F/G Stratotanker, 1961-1965
 KC-97L Stratotanker, 1965-1975

 KC-135A Stratotanker, 1975-1984
 KC-135E Stratotanker, 1984-1991
 KC-135R Stratotanker, 1991–2014

Aircraft flying in this unit
KC-135
60-0341(R) (Jun'92)

References

Ohio Air National Guard 60 Year History, Copyright 1988, Published by Headquarters Ohio Air National Guard;
 Crossroads of Liberty, Copyright 2008 by Robert M. Stroup II, Published by Pictorial Histories Publishing Co, Inc. .
 Rogers, B. (2006). United States Air Force Unit Designations Since 1978.

External links

Squadrons of the United States Air National Guard
Air refueling squadrons of the United States Air Force
Military units and formations in Ohio